Mona is a female, and sometimes male, given name and a surname of multiple origins.

Given name
As a given name, Mona can have the following meanings and origins;

In northern Europe, where the name is much more popular, Mona is interpreted as a diminutive of Monika or, rarely, of Ramona or Simona. It is sometimes associated with the title of Leonardo da Vinci's painting Mona Lisa, although in that context the word Mona is actually a title rather than a name. The word mona also means cute, monkey and doll in Spanish. In Sweden, Mona's name day is May 4.

Mona was a relatively popular given name in the United States in the 1930s, 1950s and 1960s. The highest ranking it ever reached in the US was #230, in 1950.

Notable people
Mona Achache (born 1981), French-Moroccan film director, actress and screenwriter
Mona Barthel (born 1990), German professional tennis player
Mona Beaumont (1927–2007), French-born American painter, printmaker
Mona Berglund Nilsson (born 1942), Swedish politician
Mona Charen (born 1957), American columnist and political analyst
Mona Eltahawy, Egyptian-American activist
Mona Fandey, Malaysian singer and murderer
Mona Ghoneim (born 1955), Egyptian composer
Mona Grudt (born 1971), former Miss Universe from Norway
Mona Hanna-Attisha (born 1976), pediatrician, public health advocate and Flint Water Crisis whistleblower
Mona Hatoum (born 1952), British artist of Palestinian origin
Mona Hofland (1929–2010), Norwegian actress
Mona Johannesson, Swedish model
Mona Karim, Lebanese actress
Mona Keijzer (born 1968), Dutch politician
Mona Mahmudnizhad (1965–1983), Iranian teen executed for membership of the Bahá'í faith
Mona Marshall (born 1947), American voice actress
Mona Faiz Montrage (Mona 4Reall) (born 1993), Ghanaian socialite and musician
Mona Rae Miracle (born 1939), American author, daughter of writer Berniece Baker Miracle and niece of actress Marilyn Monroe
Mona Rai, final minister of Gour (Sylhet)
Mona Sahlin (born 1957), Swedish politician
Mona Siddiqui (born 1963), British Muslim academic
Mona L. Siegel, American scholar, author, and historian
Mona Simpson (born 1957), American novelist of Syrian and German descent
Mona Tougaard (born 2002), Danish fashion model
Mona von Bismarck (1897–1983) American socialite and fashion icon
Mona Zaki, Egyptian actress

Fictional characters
Mona, a 2-year old green-skinned girl, main character in the YTV short series Nanalan'
Mona, a character in the 1986 American fantasy drama film The Boy Who Could Fly
Mona, an alchemist with green skin from the Shovel Knight video games
Mona Aamons Monzano in Kurt Vonnegut's novel Cat's Cradle
Mona Bergeron, the main character in the 1985 French film Vagabond (Sans Toit ni Loi)
Mona Dearly, played by Bette Midler in the 2000 film Drowning Mona
Mona Lott, a recurrent character in the 1929–1949 BBC Radio series It's That Man Again
Mona Mayfair in several novels by Anne Rice
Mona McCluskey, main character in television sitcom of the same name
Mona Megistus, an astrologist and playable character from the video game Genshin Impact
Mona Melendy in Elizabeth Enright's children's book series "The Melendy Quartet"
Mona Mullins, a character in the TV sitcoms Top of the Heap and Vinnie & Bobby
Mona Parker, the main character in the animated television series Mona the Vampire and the book of the same name
Mona Ramsey in the Tales of the City books by Armistead Maupin
Mona Robinson, mother of Angela Bower in the television series Who's the Boss?
Mona Rowan, a character in the 1951 novel Camilla Dickinson
Mona Sax in the Max Payne franchise
Mona Simpson (The Simpsons), Homer Simpson's estranged mother
Mona Sterling Pike, Roger Sterling's first wife on Mad Men
Mona Stevens in the novel Landfall: A Channel Story by Nevil Shute and its film adaptation
Mona Wilder, a shape-shifter in the TV adaptation of Dirk Gently's Holistic Detective Agency
Mona Vanderwaal in the Pretty Little Liars novel series
Mona, Ross Geller's girlfriend in the television series Friends, played by Bonnie Somerville
Mona, a young prostitute in the novel Mona Lisa Overdrive by William Gibson
Mona, a character in the WarioWare series of video games

Nickname
Mona Keijzer (born 1968), Dutch politician
Mona Mårtenson (1902–1956), Swedish film actress
Mona Pasquil (born 1962), American politician

Surname
As a surname, Mona can have two origins. In Italian and Greek, it is a feminine form of Moni which is a short form of Simone, the Italian form of Simon. In Arabic countries, it is derived from the given name Muna, meaning "unreachable wishes". It is the plural form of the word Munia (مـُـنيه).

Notable people with the surname include:

Domenico Mona (1550–1602), Italian late-Renaissance painter
István Móna (1940–2010), Hungarian modern pentathlete and Olympic champion
Khwezi Mona (born 1992), South African rugby union player

See also
Mona (disambiguation)
Monica (given name)
Muna (disambiguation)

References

Feminine given names
Arabic feminine given names
German feminine given names
Lists of people by nickname